Grotella citronella is a species of moth in the genus Grotella, of the family Noctuidae. This moth is found in North America, including the Mojave Desert region of California. This species was first described by William Barnes and James Halliday McDunnough in 1916.

Identification 
Grotella citronella is primarily a yellow-cream color.

References

External links
 With images.

Grotella
Taxa named by William Barnes (entomologist)
Taxa named by James Halliday McDunnough